Somerset School District may refer to:
Somerset Independent School District
School District of Somerset in Wisconsin, which includes Somerset High School (Wisconsin)